Ena is a locality located in the municipality of Las Peñas de Riglos, in Huesca province, Aragon, Spain. As of 2020, it has a population of 19.

Geography 
Ena is located 62km north-northwest of Huesca.

References

Populated places in the Province of Huesca